Fort Robinson is a former U.S. Army fort and now a major feature of Fort Robinson State Park, a  public recreation and historic preservation area located  west of Crawford on U.S. Route 20 in the Pine Ridge region of northwest Nebraska.

The fort was declared a National Historic Landmark in 1960 and is part of the Fort Robinson and Red Cloud Agency historic district. The district also includes the Camp Camby site and the 1886 Percy Homestead. The fort is managed by the Nebraska Game and Parks Commission, with some individual buildings operated by the History Nebraska and the University of Nebraska.

History
In August 1873, the Red Cloud Agency was moved from the North Platte River to the White River, near what is now Crawford, Nebraska, in the northwest corner of the state. The following March, the U. S. Government authorized the establishment of a military camp at the agency site. Some 13,000 Lakota had been subject to resettlement.

The camp was named Camp Robinson in honor of Lt. Levi H. Robinson, who had been killed by Indians while on Indian land in February.

Fort Robinson was a base of US military forces and played a major role in the Sioux Wars from 1876 to 1890. The Battle of Warbonnet Creek took place nearby in July 1876. The war chief Crazy Horse surrendered here with his defenders on May 6, 1877. On September 5 that year, he was killed while resisting imprisonment. A historic plaque marks the site of his death.

In January 1879, Chief Morning Star (also known as Dull Knife) led the Northern Cheyenne in an outbreak from the Agency. Because the Cheyenne had refused to return to Indian Territory, where they believed conditions were too adverse for them to survive, the army had been holding and starving them of food, water and heat during the severe winter. This campaign of torture and neglect was a tactic to try to force them into submission. U.S. soldiers hunted down the escapees, killing men, women, and children in the Fort Robinson massacre. The U.S. Supreme Court described it as a "shocking story", "one of the most melancholy of Indian tragedies". The event marked the end of the Sioux and Cheyenne wars in Nebraska.

In 1885, the 9th Cavalry Regiment, nicknamed the Buffalo Soldiers by Native Americans, was stationed at Fort Robinson. During the next several years, the fort was enlarged, and military training was a major activity. From 1889-1890, Second Lieutenant Charles Young served here and later was reassigned to the regiment. A black pioneer officer who had graduated from West Point, he was the highest-ranking black person in the US Army throughout his career and achieved the rank of colonel. From 1887-1898, the fort served as regimental headquarters. The post gymnasium and theatre, built in 1904, provided entertainment for the soldiers.

In 1919 at the end of World War I, Fort Robinson became the world's largest quartermaster remount depot. It was used as a breeding and training center for horses and mules for the military.  In addition, stallions owned by the military were used to breed with local stock to improve it.  During the Great Depression, a hobo was murdered on a Chicago & Northwestern freight train within the fort. During World War II, the fort was the site of a K-9 corps training center and a German prisoner-of-war camp.

Closing
The U.S. Army decided to abandon Fort Robinson in 1947; in the following year, it transferred the property to the U.S. Department of Agriculture (USDA), for its Beef Cattle Research Station. After some buildings were demolished in the mid-1950s, efforts were made to preserve the fort as a historic site. In 1955, History Nebraska, formally the Nebraska State Historical Society, began to acquire property on the fort; in 1956, they opened a museum on the site. The USDA closed its operation in 1971, and transferred the property to the state of Nebraska.

State park
The Fort Robinson State Park was established in 1956 following the purchase of a parcel of land by the Nebraska Game, Forestation and Parks Commission in 1955. The park was expanded after much of the site was deeded over from the Federal government in 1964. It reached its full size with Nebraska's purchase of the adjoining James Arthur Ranch in 1972.

Features

The fort's historic buildings and sites include the 1904 blacksmith shop, the 1908 veterinary hospital, the 1887 officers' quarters, the 1875 guardhouse and adjutant's office, and the post cemetery. There is also a library with materials about Fort Robinson and military and western history available for research. A quartermaster's stores building is now used as a playhouse.

The Fort Robinson Museum is located in the 1905 post headquarters building. Exhibits focus on the fort's history, including its role guarding the Red Cloud Agency from 1874 to 1877, up through the housing of World War II German POWs from 1943 to 1946. The Trailside Museum of Natural History, operated by the University of Nebraska State Museum, is located in the historic Army Theatre building.

Fort Robinson is also home to The Post Playhouse, a professional theatre company that produces live theatre during summer months with creative teams of actors, musicians, and directors assembled from across the United States and nearby.

Further reading
Barnes, Jeff. Forts of the Northern Plains: Guide to Historic Military Posts of the Plains Indian Wars. Mechanicsburg, PA: Stackpole Books, 2008. 
Buecker, Thomas R. Fort Robinson and the American West, 1874-1899. Norman, OK: University of Oklahoma, 2003. 
Buecker, Thomas R. Fort Robinson and the American Century, 1900-1948. Lincoln, NE: Nebraska State Historical Society, 2002.

See also
List of forts in the United States

References

External links

Fort Robinson State Park Nebraska Game and Parks Commission
Fort Robinson Park Map Nebraska Game and Parks Commission
Fort Robinson History Center History Nebraska 
Trailside Museum of Natural History at Fort Robinson University of Nebraska

African-American history of Nebraska
1874 establishments in Nebraska
1948 disestablishments in Nebraska
Great Sioux War of 1876
Former American Indian reservations in Nebraska
Robinson
Historic districts on the National Register of Historic Places in Nebraska
Military sites of the wars between the United States and Native Americans
Military and war museums in Nebraska
Museums in Dawes County, Nebraska
Museums in Sioux County, Nebraska
National Historic Landmarks in Nebraska
Native American museums in Nebraska
Native American history of Nebraska
State parks of Nebraska
World War II prisoner of war camps in the United States
Protected areas of Dawes County, Nebraska
Protected areas of Sioux County, Nebraska
Robinson
National Register of Historic Places in Dawes County, Nebraska
National Register of Historic Places in Sioux County, Nebraska
Protected areas established in 1956
History Nebraska
Theatres in Nebraska